Charburja Durbar was a palace within Thapathali Durbar Complex in Kathmandu, the capital of the Nepal. Charburja literally translates Four Burg Palace. This palace was built by Jung Bahadur Rana in the year 1849 for Jind Kaur (locally known as Chanda kunwar in Nepal) youngest Queen consort of Maharaja Ranjit Singh of Sikh Empire.

History

Charburja Durbar was built by Jung Bahadur Rana for Rani Jind Kaur youngest Queen of Maharaja Ranjit Singh of Sikh Empire. Rani Jind Kaur escaped British imprisonment from the Chunar Fort, disguised as a servant and travelled through 800 miles of forest and reached Kathmandu on 29 April 1849. Initially, she stayed at the residence of Amar Bikram Shah, son of General Chautariya Pushkar Shah, who had been Nepal's Prime Minister in 1838–39. Amar Bikram Shah's residence in the Narayanhiti area provided her with the facilities and dignity offered to royalty. But whenever outsiders came, she would disguise herself and was introduced as a "maid/cook from Hindusthan". She stayed in Amar Bikram Shah's house for a few months before she decided to come out of her hiding and approach the then Prime Minister Jung Bahadur Rana.

She was given asylum by King of Nepal and Jung Bahadur Rana with full dignity as a Queen consort of Maharaja Ranjit Singh . A New palace was built for Rani Jind Kaura in Thapathali durbar complex with four Burg and thus was immediately naming it Charburja Durbar which literally translates as palace with Four Burgs. Charburja Durbar was occupied by her through her stay in Nepal for 11 years and was eventually given as alms to a Brahmin priest before her departure to England.
Due to the palaces strategical location in Thapathali Durbar complex, Jung Bahadur bought this palace back from the Brahmin priest who got it as alms and started using it as a Court House.

Earthquake of 1934

Charburja Durbar was seriously damaged during the 1934 Nepal–Bihar earthquake. Charburja Durbar was not repaired and finally turned into ruins.

Current status
Today in the grounds of Charburja Durbar, Paropakar Indra Rajya Lakshmi Devi Prasuti Griha maternity hospital is built. Popularly known as Prasuti Griha, Nepal's first maternity hospital and opened on 26 September 1959.

See also
Rana palaces of Nepal
Jung Bahadur Rana
Ranjit Singh
Jind Kaur
Chautariya Puskhar Shah

References

Rana palaces of Nepal
Palaces in Kathmandu
Former palaces in Nepal